Sami Kukkohovi (born 26 July 1974) is a Finnish musician, best known as the bassist of the metal band Sentenced. He joined the band in 1996, replacing Taneli Jarva, and stayed with Sentenced up until they disbanded in 2005. Firstly, he was only a session member on gigs, but after that he joined the band officially. In addition to playing the bass guitar, he was also the back-up vocalist. Kukkohovi has been the guitar player for the hard rock band Solution 13 during his time with Sentenced. On live shows of the Doom metal band KYPCK, the crew is strengthened by Sami Kukkohovi, playing the second guitar. Currently Kukkohovi is playing with his new band Fiasco General.

Discography

Studio albums 
with Sentenced
 Frozen (1998)
 Crimson (2000)
 The Cold White Light (2002)
 The Funeral Album (2005)

Live album 
with Sentenced
 Buried Alive (2 discs, 2006)

Demotracks 
with Fiasco General
 All Roads Lead To Pain (2007)
 Void (2007)

DVDs 
with Sentenced
 Buried Alive (two discs, 2006)

Singles 
with Sentenced
 Killing Me Killing You (1999)
 No One There (2002)
 Routasydän (2003)
 Ever-Frost'' (2005)

References 

1974 births
Living people
Finnish male musicians
People from Oulu